Carlini is a small lunar impact crater located in the Mare Imbrium. It was named after Italian astronomer Francesco Carlini. The crater is bowl-shaped with a small central floor. It has a higher albedo than the surrounding mare, making it prominent due to its isolated location. To the south is a wrinkle ridge named Dorsum Zirkel, and farther south lies the peak Mons La Hire.

Satellite craters
By convention these features are identified on lunar maps by placing the letter on the side of the crater midpoint that is closest to Carlini.

The following craters have been renamed by the IAU.
 Carlini B — See McDonald (crater).

References

 
 
 
 
 
 
 
 
 
 
 

Impact craters on the Moon
Mare Imbrium